Perfect Harmony is an American musical comedy television series created by Lesley Wake Webster that aired on NBC from September 26, 2019 to January 23, 2020. The series stars Bradley Whitford as Dr. Arthur Cochran who is a music director at a small church in the fictional town of Conley Fork, Kentucky and Anna Camp as Ginny who is a single mother and waitress, and is the leading choir member.

The series also stars Will Greenberg, Tymberlee Hill, Geno Segers, Rizwan Manji and Spencer Allport. In June 2020, the series was canceled after one season.

Premise
In this single camera comedy, a rural church gets the choir director it never thought it needed when a salty, Ivy League music professor stumbles through their door.

Cast
Bradley Whitford as Dr. Arthur Cochran, a recently widowed former instructor at Princeton who becomes music director at a small church in the fictional town of Conley Fork, Kentucky. Abrasive and blunt, he sets out to transform the church's failing choir through his unorthodox, yet highly effective methods.
Anna Camp as Ginny, a single mother and waitress who leads the choir. Sings soprano.
Will Greenberg as Wayne, Ginny's ex-husband who is also a member of the choir. Sings tenor.
Tymberlee Hill as Adams, a member of the choir and a local businesswoman. Sings alto.
Geno Segers as Dwayne, Wayne's best friend and a member of the choir secretly in love with Ginny. Sings bass.
Rizwan Manji as Reverend Jax, a missionary who runs the church and a member of the choir.
Spencer Allport as Cash, Ginny and Wayne's son who struggles with dyslexia. In "Thanks-Taking", his full name is given as Cassius Clay Hawkins, a reference to Muhammad Ali.

Production

Development
On October 23, 2018, it was announced that NBC had given the production for the pilot production commitment. On January 25, 2019, the production officially received a pilot order. The pilot was written by Lesley Wake Webster who executive produces alongside Bradley Whitford, Jason Winer, Jon Radler and Adam Anders. Production companies involved with the pilot include Small Dog Picture Company and 20th Century Fox Television. On May 11, 2019, it was announced that the production had been given a series order, together with Indebted and Lincoln Rhyme: Hunt for the Bone Collector. A day after that, it was announced that the series would premiere in the fall of 2019 and air on Thursday night in the 2019–20 television season at 8:30 P.M. The series debuted on September 26, 2019. On June 10, 2020, NBC canceled the series after one season.

Casting
In February 2019, it was announced that Bradley Whitford, Anna Camp and Will Greenberg had been cast in the pilot's leading roles. Although the pilot was ordered, in March 2019 it was reported that Tymberlee Hill, Geno Segers and Rizwan Manji had joined the cast.

Episodes

Release
In countries like Australia and New Zealand the show is available to stream on Disney+ Star because 20th Century Fox Television was involved in the show.

Marketing
On May 12, 2019, NBC released the first official trailer for the series.

Reception

Critical response
On review aggregation Rotten Tomatoes, the series holds an approval rating of 62% with an average rating of 6.67/10, based on 13 reviews. The website's critical consensus reads, "Perfect Harmony precarious premise doesn't always hit the right notes, but a charming cast and a few clever jokes inspire hope that with a little more practice it could really sing." Metacritic, which uses a weighted average, assigned the series a score of 54 out of 100 based on 8 critics, indicating "mixed or average reviews".

Ratings

References

External links 

2010s American musical comedy television series
2020s American musical comedy television series
2010s American single-camera sitcoms
2020s American single-camera sitcoms
2019 American television series debuts
2020 American television series endings
English-language television shows
NBC original programming
Television series by 20th Century Fox Television
Television series by Universal Television
Television shows set in Kentucky